Harold Morris may refer to:

Harold Morris (composer) (1890–1964), American pianist, composer and educator
Harold Morris (politician) (1876–1967), British lawyer, judge and politician
Whiz Morris (Harold Marsh Morris, 1898–1984), English cricketer
Harold Arthur Morris (1884–1977), awarded the Freedom of the City of Kimberley, South Africa

See also
Harry Morris (disambiguation)